Alex Correia Diniz (born 20 October 1985) is a Brazilian professional racing cyclist, who is currently suspended from the sport. He was born in Recife, and his specialties are climbing and endurance races.

He served a two-year drugs ban between 2009 and 2011, after testing positive for erythropoietin (EPO) and his 2009 results were cancelled. He soloed to victory after attacking at the foot of the final climb, the Mirador del Potrero, taking the leader's jersey in the process.

In 2017, Diniz was given an eight-year ban for anomalies in his biological passport.

Major results

2005
 3rd Road race, National Under-23 Road Championships
2006
 1st  Overall Volta de São Paulo
1st Stage 7
 3rd Road race, Pan American Cycling Championships
 5th Overall Volta do Paraná
2007
 1st  Overall Tour de Santa Catarina
1st Stages 1 (TTT), 2 & 7
 6th Overall Volta do Paraná
 8th Overall Tour do Rio
2008
 1st Stage 3 Volta do Paraná
2009
 1st  Overall Tour de Santa Catarina 
1st Stage 4
2012
 2nd Overall Tour do Rio
1st Mountains classification
 8th Overall Rutas de América
 8th Overall Tour do Brasil
1st Stage 7
2013
 2nd Road race, National Road Championships
 3rd Overall Tour de San Luis
1st Stage 3
2014
 2nd Overall Tour do Brasil
1st  Points classification
 8th Overall Tour of Utah
 10th Overall Tour do Rio
2015
 3rd Overall Tour do Rio
2016
 7th Overall Tour of Hainan

References

External links

Alex Correia Diniz' profile on Cycling Base

1985 births
Living people
Brazilian male cyclists
Brazilian road racing cyclists
Sportspeople from Recife
Doping cases in cycling
21st-century Brazilian people
20th-century Brazilian people